Gordon Gibson (1 November 1908 – 7 July 1967) was an Australian cricketer. He played six first-class matches for Tasmania between 1928 and 1933.

See also
 List of Tasmanian representative cricketers

References

External links
 

1908 births
1967 deaths
Australian cricketers
Tasmania cricketers
Cricketers from Hobart